Derek McNicholas (born 1984 in Castlepollard, County Westmeath) is an Irish sportsperson.  He plays hurling with his local club Lough Lene Gaels and has been a member of the Westmeath senior inter-county team since 2004.

References

1985 births
Living people
Lough Lene Gaels hurlers
Westmeath inter-county hurlers